Richard Kemp Johnson (1895 – 3 January 1933) was an English footballer who played in the Football League for Liverpool, New Brighton and Stoke City.

Career
Johnson was born in Gateshead and played for Victoria Adelaide, Bensham, Hebburn Argyle, Marley Hill United and Felling Colliery before joining Liverpool in 1919. He scored 13 goals in 27 games in 1920–21 and his 16 goals in 41 in 1922–23 helped the Anfield side to win the Football League First Division. He left for Stoke City in February 1925 and he scored four goals towards the end of the 1924–25 season to help Stoke avoid the drop however relegation was suffered the following season. He helped Stoke gain an instant return winning the Football League Third Division North in 1926–27 and then became a backup player until his departure to New Brighton in August 1929. He spent two seasons at New Brighton and the left for Welsh League side Connah's Quay & Shotton before his death at the age of 38 in 1933.

Career statistics
Source:

Honours
 Liverpool
 Football League First Division champions: 1922–23

 Stoke City
 Football League Third Division North champions: 1926–27

References

1895 births
1933 deaths
Footballers from Gateshead
Association football forwards
English footballers
Felling Colliery A.F.C. players
Liverpool F.C. players
New Brighton A.F.C. players
Stoke City F.C. players
Connah's Quay Nomads F.C. players
English Football League players